Oyayubi Island is a narrow rock island . Oyayubi Point is a rocky point marking the southern end of Oyayubi Island.

Both the island and the point were mapped from surveys and air photos by Japanese Antarctic Research Expedition (JARE), 1957–62. The point gives its name to the island, rather than the other way around. Oyayubi-misaki, meaning "thumb point," was named in association with Cape Nakayubi ("middle-finger point"), which lies immediately northward. The name Oyayubi-jima (thumb island) was given by JARE in association with Oyayubi Point.

See also 
 List of antarctic and sub-antarctic islands

References 

Islands of Queen Maud Land
Prince Harald Coast